Ilahia College of Arts and Science (ICAS), located in Moovattupuzha, Ernakulam, Kerala state, India, is an arts and science college.  The campus is situated 5 km from the city, set atop a hillock.

ICAS  was established in 1995. It is approved by the AICTE and affiliated to the Mahatma Gandhi University.

The college provides Bachelor of Computer Applications (BCA), Bachelor of Business Administration (BBA) and Bachelor of Science Electronics (BSc) degrees.

History 
ILAHIA College of Arts and Science is founded and managed by ILAHIA Trust, Muvattupuzha. Since its establishment in 1992, the Trust has contributed to regional educational achievements, establishing schools, and science and engineering colleges. The trust has around 70 members, of which 13 members are elected to Executive Committee. 

Seats
 Bachelor of Computer Applications (BCA) - 60
 Bachelor of Business Administration (BBA) - 60
 Bachelor of Science Electronics (BSc) - 60

Bachelor of Computer Applications (BCA) 
Mode of admission

Candidates for admission to the BCA Degree course will have passed the higher secondary/+2/XII Std. examination conducted by boards or departments recognized by the University, obtaining not less than 50% marks in Mathematics and not less than 50% marks in Mathematics, Physics and Chemistry put together.

Bachelor of Business Administration (BBA) 
Mode of admission

Candidates for admission to the BBA Degree course will have passed the higher secondary/+2/XII Std. examination conducted by boards or departments recognized by the University, obtaining not less than 50% marks in Humanities.

Bachelor of Science Electronics (BSc) 
B.Com Model-1 Computer Application
B.Com Model-11 Computer Application
B.Com Model-11 Tax
B.A English
BLiSc
M.Com-Finance
M.Com Marketing
M.A  English
M.Sc Computer
M.Sc Electronics

 
Mode of admission

Candidates for admission to the BSc Degree will have passed the higher secondary/+2/XII Std. examination conducted by boards or departments recognized by the University, obtaining not less than 50% marks in Mathematics and not less than 50% marks in Mathematics, Physics and Chemistry put together.

Institutions under the same management 
Apart from the engineering college, the Ilahia Trust has a group of educational institutions under its wings namely:
ILAHIA College of Engineering and Technology,
ILAHIA Public School (CBSE),

References

External links
Official website

Arts and Science colleges in Kerala
Colleges affiliated to Mahatma Gandhi University, Kerala
Universities and colleges in Ernakulam district
Educational institutions established in 1995
1995 establishments in Kerala